The "Aberdeen lake" is the main head water of the Aberdeen River, located in Upper Batiscanie in the territory of the city of La Tuque, in the administrative region of Mauricie, in the province of Quebec, Canada.

This hydrographic slope is served on the west and south side by the forest road R0410.

Forestry is the main economic activity in the sector; recreational activities, second.

The surface of Lake Aberdeen is generally frozen from the beginning of December to the end of March; however, safe circulation on the ice is generally from late December to early March.

Geography 

This long, landlocked lake is mainly fed by seven discharges from the surrounding mountains.

Aberdeen Lake has an island (length:  in the north central part of the lake and ten other small islands. It also has five bays, two on the north side, one to the west where a few chalets have been built and two bays on the south side, one of which is to the southeast where the outlet of the lake is located. Finally, the current flows into the upper part of the Batiscan River which goes southward to the north-west shore of Saint Lawrence river.

Toponymy 
The toponym "Aberdeen Lake" was formalized on December 5, 1968 at the Place Names Bank of the Commission de toponymie du Québec.

Notes and references

See also 

 Batiscanie
 Aberdeen River
 Rivière aux Castors Noirs
 Batiscan River
 Lac aux Biscuits
 La Tuque

External links 

Lakes of Mauricie
La Tuque, Quebec